Stepan Razin is a 1939 Soviet drama film directed by Ivan Pravov and Olga Preobrazhenskaya.

Plot 
Don Cossack Stepan Razin vowed to take revenge on the boyars for his tortured friends. Having headed the risen peasants, he becomes the leader of the whole army. From all over the Russian land flock to him humiliated and offended.

Cast
 Andrei Abrikosov	 as Stepan Bazin
 Vladimir Gardin as Kivrin
 Elena Kondratyeva as Alyona,   Razina
 Pyotr Leontyev as Tsar Alexis of Russia
 Ivan Pelttser as Grandfather Taras
 Nina Zorskaya as Persian Princess
 Mikhail Zharov as Lazunka
 Sergey Martinson as Fyodor

References

External links 

1939 films
1930s Russian-language films
Soviet black-and-white films
1930s historical drama films
Mosfilm films
Films set in the 17th century
Soviet historical drama films